Koldo Abando Olabarri (born November 19, 1992, Bilbao, Spain), known as Koldo Olabarri, is a Spanish film, theater and television actor.

Life and career 

He studied, trained and graduated in theatre, drama and acting (BA) in Ánima Eskola School of Drama with David Valdelvira, Marina Shimanskaya and Algis Arlauskas, training as a method actor, under the Stanislavsky-M.Chekhov-Grotowski-Vakhtangov methodology (Russian method), following the methodologies of the Russian classical school. He also trained with Agentinian stage director and drama teacher Juan Carlos Corazza.

Since 2010, he has worked in more than a dozen theatrical productions, more than a dozen television series and more than a dozen movies. In 2010, he performed the play Shadows of Forgotten Ancestors, directed by Spanish stage director David Valdelvira, which was awarded the Buero Vallejo Award (2011). In 2012, he performed the play An ordinary day at the Moulin Rouge, a theatrical production at the Campos Elíseos Theatre, directed by Spanish stage director David Valdelvira, which was awarded the Buero Vallejo Award (2013).

In the year 2021 he was part of the cast of the comedy film Official Competition, along with Spanish actors Penélope Cruz and Antonio Banderas, directed by Mariano Cohn & Gastón Duprat, premiered t the 78th Venice International Film Festival and also screened at the Toronto International Film Festival and at the San Sebastián International Film Festival.

In 2020 he was part of the cast of the theater production of the Arriaga Theatre "Erresuma/Kingdom/Reino", directed by Calixto Bieito, playing Henry VI, a play based on the main tragedies of William Shakespeare.

In 2022 he was part of the cast of the Netflix original series Intimacy, along with Itziar Ituño, Patricia López Arnaiz, Emma Suárez, Verónica Echegui and Ana Wagener.

In 2020, he had to be admitted to the hospital due to severe COVID-19.

Filmography

Television 

 2022: Intimacy - Netflix
 2020: Altsasu - ETB1
 2020ː El Ministerio del Tiempo - La 1
 2020: Vamos Juan - TNT Spain
 2016/2018: Centro Médico - La 1
 2016: Beta
 2015: Eskamak Kentzen - ETB1
 2014: Bienvenidos al Lolita - Antena 3
 2012: Goenkale - ETB1
 2012: Bi eta Bat - ETB1

Film 

 2021, Official Competition, dir. Mariano Cohn & Gastón Duprat
 2020: Tres veces, dir. Paco Ruiz
 2018: Ane, dir. David Pérez Sañudo
 2018: Cuando dejes de quererme, dir. Igor Legarreta
 2017: Versus, dir. Demetrio Elorz
 2015: Playa de las Mujeres, dir. Iñigo Cobo
 2013: Por un puñado de besos, dir. David Menkes
 2012: Agua!, dir. Mikel Rueda
 2010: (d)efecto, dir. Gotzon Aurrekoetxea
 2010: Yerba, dir. Javier Hernández

Stage 

 2022, Sagastitarrak
 2020, Erresuma/Kingdom/Reino, dir. Calixto Bieito
 2018, El Último Habsburgo, dir. David Caíña, Elena Vaio
 2017, Obabakoak, dir. Calixto Bieito
 2016-2018, Chichinabo Cabaret, dir. Felipe Loza
 2016-2017, Romeo and Juliet, dir. Ramón Barea
 2016-2017, Triple Salto/Jauzi Hirukoitza, dir. Miguel Olmeda
 2015, Planteamiento, Nudo y Desenlace, dir. Itziar Lazkano
 2014, Romeo and Juliet, dir. Victoria Di Pace
 2014: Egun Berri Bat, dir. Galder Perez
 2012, An ordinary day at the Moulin Rouge, dir. David Valdelvira
 2011, Isn't it true that we will be forever?, dir. Marina Shimanskaya
 2010, Shadows of Forgotten Ancestors, dir. David Valdelvira

Awards and nominations

Buero Vallejo Awards

References

External links 

 
 

1992 births
Living people
People from Bilbao
Ánima Eskola School of Drama alumni
21st-century Spanish actors
Spanish film actors
Spanish television actors
Spanish stage actors